This list involves the members of the Standing Committee of the National People's Congress of China, who were last elected by the 12th National People's Congress in March 2013.

Current members

Statistics

Seats by party

Seats by ethnicity

Seats by birthyear

References